Alcaeus, the son of Miccus, was an Athenian comic poet. His comedies marked the transition between Old Comedy and Middle Comedy. In 388 BC, his play Pasiphae was awarded the fifth (i.e. last) place prize in the same contest that Aristophanes exhibited his play Plutus.

Fabricius mentions another Alcaeus, a tragedian. This appears to be the same person as Alcaeus the comic poet.

Surviving titles and fragments
Fragments of ten plays have survived. The titles of eight plays still exist, along with forty fragments altogether, most of which suggest that he worked mainly in mythological subjects.

Adephai Moicheuomenai ("The Adulterous Sisters")
Callisto
Endymion
Hieros Gamos ("Holy Marriage")
Komadotragodia ("Comedo-Tragedy")
Palaistra ("Palaestra")
Panymedes
Pasiphae (See above)

References

Ancient Greek dramatists and playwrights
Old Comic poets
Middle Comic poets